Westergren, Swedish surname, may refer to:

Carl Westergren (1895–1958), Swedish wrestler
Håkan Westergren (1899–1981), Swedish actor
Isaac Westergren (1875–1950), Swedish track and field athlete
Meg Westergren (born 1932), Swedish actress
Tim Westergren (born 1965), American businessman, One of the founders of Pandora Radio

Swedish-language surnames